Lipa is a small settlement in the Municipality of Zreče in northeastern Slovenia. It lies on the main road leading west from Zreče towards Vitanje. The area is part of the traditional region of Styria. It is now included with the rest of the municipality in the Savinja Statistical Region.

References

External links
Lipa at Geopedia

Populated places in the Municipality of Zreče